is an unincorporated city located in the , a border region between Kyoto, Osaka, and Nara Prefectures in Kansai region, Japan. The name Keihanna is constructed by extracting a representative kanji from Kyoto, Osaka, and Nara. The city was constructed to help the advancement of creative arts, sciences, and research, as well as to spur the creation of new industries and cultures.

Location 

Osaka Prefecture

Kyoto Prefecture

Nara Prefecture

Out of these, Seika in Kyoto Prefecture is completely inside the Kansai Science City.

There are 12 "Cultural and Academic Research Zones" within the Kansai Science City, encompassing , with an estimated population of 100,000. Seika & Nishikizu is the central district of this city. Fugenji and Kita-Tawara are science districts in land use adjustment.

Aerial photographs

Main research institutes and universities

Universities
Shijonawate Campus, Osaka Electro-Communication University
Doshisha University - Kyotanabe Campus, Tatara Campus, and Gakken Toshi Campus
Kyotanabe Campus, Doshisha Women's College of Liberal Arts 
Institute of Free electron laser (iFEL), Osaka University
Nara Institute of Science and Technology
Seika Campus, Kyoto Prefectural University
Experimental Farm, Kyoto University

Research institutes
Universal Communication Research Institute, National Institute of Information and Communications Technology (NICT)
Advanced Telecommunications Research Institute International (ATR)
Technology Research Laboratory, Shimadzu
Keihanna Research Center, Kyocera - optical and electronic devices, solar cells, advanced thin-film technologies
Kansai Photon Science Institute, National Institutes for Quantum and Radiological Science and Technology (QST)
Keihanna Site, Panasonic
Keihanna Technology Innovation Center, OMRON
International Institute for Advanced Studies (IIAS)
Nara Research and Development Center, Santen Pharmaceutical
Rohto Research Village Kyoto
Kansai Electronic Industry Development Center - supported by the Ministry of Economy, Trade and Industry
Ion Technology Center
Research Institute of Innovative Technology for the Earth (RITE) - supported by the Ministry of Economy, Trade and Industry
Keihanna Campus, Riken
Suntory World Research Center
Nidec Center for Industrial Science
Keihanna Area, NTT Communication Science Laboratories
Nara Research Institute for Cultural Properties

Other
Kansai-kan of the National Diet Library
Heijō Palace
Keihanna Open Innovation Center @Kyoto (KICK)
Keihanna Plaza

Transportation 
Gakkentoshi Line, West Japan Railway Company (JR West)
Nara Line (JR West)
Kyoto Line, Kintetsu Railway (Kintetsu)
Keihanna Line (Kintetsu)
Shin-Meishin Expressway
Second Keihan Highway
Keinawa Expressway

In 2016, a government committee planning the final Kyoto-Osaka segment of the Hokuriku Shinkansen proposed routing the new high-speed line through Kyōtanabe.

About 100 minutes by bus from Kansai International Airport.

Notes

References 

This article was translated from a portion of the corresponding article in the Japanese Wikipedia, retrieved on December 10, 2006.

See also 
Hanshin Industrial Region
Harima Science Garden City
Tsukuba Science City

External links

Keihanna Science City - Public Foundation of Kansai Research Institute
The Kansai Science City Construction Act - Ministry of Land, Infrastructure, Transport and Tourism

Kansai Science City
Osaka University research